Fly Me is a 1973 United States-Filipino sexploitation film about the adventures of three flight attendants.

Plot
Three young flight attendants fly from Los Angeles, California to Hong Kong. Toby's mother has followed her on the plane and Toby tries to lose her so she can romance a doctor, David. Andrea's lover Donald has gone missing. Sherry is smuggling drugs and is kidnapped by a white slave ring.

Cast
Pat Anderson as Toby
Lenore Kasdorf as Andrea
Lyllah Torena as Sherry
Richard Young as David
Naomi Stevens as Toby's mother
Richard Miller as Taxi driver	
Ken Metcalfe as Donald
Vic Diaz as Enriquez
Richard Roake as Co-Pilot

Production
The film contains some kung fu scenes shot by Jonathan Demme and Joe Dante worked on the movie as a dialogue director.

Corman did not want the film to seem like it was done in the Philippines so he had Curtis Hanson shoot an opening sequence in Los Angeles where Pat Anderson jumped in a taxi cab driven by Dick Miller.

Reception
Roger Corman says the film was successful, which he attributed in part to its strong women's lib stance.

Writing for Slant, critic Budd Wilkins described the film as "rife with wooden acting, knowingly awful dialogue, and plenty of kung-fu action," that the editing was "lousy [...] as though the film had been cut with a blunt machete and some Super Glue, which the editor was doubtless huffing," and "the fights look to have been choreographed like a game of Blind Man’s Bluff." Critic Rich Rosell wrote in DVD Talk that although the film "is fairly awful it is still fun in its own high camp kind of way," that it is "loaded with unintentionally funny chop-socky fight scenes balanced out by obligatory attractive female nekkidness," and that "it has a silly, low-rent charm despite the abundant imperfections."

References

External links
Fly Me at The A.V. Club

1973 films
American exploitation films
1970s English-language films
American aviation films
New World Pictures films
Films set in Hong Kong
Films shot in Los Angeles
Films shot in the Philippines
1970s exploitation films
Films directed by Cirio H. Santiago
1970s American films